This article displays the vote tallies of each senatorial candidate in the 2013 Philippine Senate election in every region of the Philippines. The tables below shall only show the 15 leading candidates in each region and 99% of the transmitted election returns, unless otherwise stated. Names in yellow won in the nationwide vote.

NCR: National Capital Region

CAR: Cordillera Administrative Region

Region 1: Ilocos

Region 2: Cagayan Valley

Region 3: Central Luzon

Region 4-A: CALABARZON

Region 4-B: MIMAROPA

Region 5: Bicol

Region 6: Western Visayas

Region 7: Central Visayas

Region 8: Eastern Visayas

Region 9: Zamboanga Peninsula

Region 10: Northern Mindanao

Region 11: Davao Region

Region 12: SOCCSKARGEN

Region 13: Caraga

ARMM: Autonomous Region in Muslim Mindanao

References

Senate elections